Avdella is a village and a former municipality in Grevena regional unit, West Macedonia, Greece. Since the 2011 local government reform, it has been a municipal unit of Grevena. It is a seasonal Aromanian village in the Pindus mountains, at 1250–1350 metres altitude.  Its summer population is about 3000, but in the winter there are only a few watchmen. The 2011 census recorded 280 inhabitants. It is notable as the birthplace of the Manakis brothers, and appears in the opening sequence of the film Ulysses' Gaze. The community of Avdella covers an area of 43.243 km2.

History 

The first foundation of Avdella remains unknown. Perhaps it was connected to the creation of settlements on the mountain range of Smolikas with the delivery of veterinary surgeon activity of region. In the beginning, Aromanian families created small family settlements which were fused and became a single settlement such as current Avdella. The foundation and the growth of Avdella is associated with the rise of livestock-farming taking into account the pastoral habits of the locals. Before 1800, the village was situated in the "Fantines", but the residents, mostly large families of Aromanian shepherds moved to the current position due to better climate.

Under Ottoman rule, Avdella was in the kaza of Grevena, Sanjak of Serfice (modern Servia), Vilayet of Monastir (modern Bitola).

The first Romanian school in the region of modern Greece was founded in Avdella in 1867 by local Aromanian Apostol Mărgărit.

Some authors claim that Avdella was a center of pro-Romanian sentiment in the beginning of the 20th century, contributing figures such as Apostol Mărgărit. It was burned in October 1905 by Greek antartes because of this. Contributing leaders such as Zisis Verros in Macedonian Struggle were fighting for the Greek cause.

On 14 July 1944, the village was burned again by a group of German Nazis, during their retreat.

Population

Notable people
 Ioan D. Caragiani (1841–1921), Aromanian folklorist and translator
 Yanaki and Milton Manaki (1872–1954 and 1882–1964), Aromanian photography and cinema pioneers
 Apostol Mărgărit (1832–1903), Aromanian educator and activist
 Pericle Papahagi (1872–1943), Aromanian historian and folklorist
 Tache Papahagi (1892–1977), Aromanian folklorist and linguist
 Nushi Tulliu (1872–1941), Aromanian poet and prose writer
 Zisis Verros (1880–1985), Greek chieftain of the Macedonian Struggle

See also
 Avdhela Project, an Aromanian digital library and cultural initiative named after the Aromanian name of Avdella

Notes

See also
List of settlements in the Grevena regional unit

Populated places in Grevena (regional unit)
Former municipalities in Western Macedonia
Aromanian settlements in Greece